Honey Mustard may refer to:

 Honey mustard, a blend of mustard and honey
 Honey Mustard (manhwa), a Korean manhwa comic book by Ho-Kyung Yeo
 "Honey Mustard" (song), a 1995 song by Trusty off the album Goodbye, Dr. Fate
 Honey Mustard (character), a fictional character from the animated film Sausage Party, see List of suicides in fiction

See also

 "Honey Mustard Waltz" (song), a song by Yoko Kanno off the soundtrack album Kids on the Slope Soundtrack & Jazz Music Collection for the Japanese TV anime cartoon Kids on the Slope; see Music of Kids on the Slope
 Honey Dijon (disambiguation)
 
 Mustard (disambiguation)
 Honey (disambiguation)